Goodnight Vienna is the fourth studio album by Ringo Starr. It was recorded in the summer of 1974 in Los Angeles, and released later that year. Goodnight Vienna followed the commercially successful predecessor Ringo, and Starr used many of the same players, including Billy Preston, Klaus Voormann, Robbie Robertson, Harry Nilsson, and producer Richard Perry. The title is a Liverpool slang phrase meaning "it's all over".

Background and recording
While all three other former Beatles had contributed to Ringo (1973), only John Lennon contributed to Goodnight Vienna.  
On 17 June 1974, Starr called Lennon, who was about to record his Walls and Bridges album, and asked him to write a song he could include on his next album. Lennon wrote what became the title track, "Goodnight Vienna". A demo of "(It's All Down to) Goodnight Vienna" was recorded by Lennon on 28 June, with the session musicians from Walls & Bridges and sent to Starr in advance of the sessions. Besides writing and playing piano on the title track, Lennon suggested Starr cover The Platters' hit "Only You (And You Alone)" playing acoustic guitar and providing a guide vocal for Starr to follow. Starr's versions of both "Only You (And You Alone)" and "(It's All Down to) Goodnight Vienna" were recorded at a session produced by Lennon. Elton John also contributed a track, "Snookeroo", co-written with Bernie Taupin. Harry Nilsson gave Starr the track "Easy for Me", which he later recorded his own version of for his Duit on Mon Dei album.

Release

"Only You (And You Alone)", backed with "Call Me", was issued as an advance single from the album in the US on 11 November 1974, before the album was released. In the US the song reached number 6 on the Billboard Hot 100. Goodnight Vienna was released on the same day as the "Only You (And You Alone)" single in the UK on 15 November. The album reached only number 30 in the UK, and would be Starr's last chart album in his homeland until 1998. The album was released in the US on 18 November, and peaked at number 8, ultimately going gold, and its reviews were generally favourable. It was also originally released in quadrophonic. A promo film for "Only You (And You Alone)" was aired on Top of the Pops on 19 December. On 27 January 1975, "No No Song", backed with "Snookeroo", was released in the US, reaching number 3. Nearly a month later, on 21 February, "Snookeroo" was released as a single in the UK, backed with "Oo-Wee".

On 2 June, a special edit of "(It's All Down to) Goodnight Vienna" and "Goodnight Vienna (Reprise)" was released as a single, backed with an edit of "Oo-Wee", in the US. The cover artwork for Goodnight Vienna was based on a still from the classic 1951 science fiction film The Day the Earth Stood Still, with Starr's head replacing that of actor Michael Rennie shown standing behind the robot Gort. Rennie's character was the alien Klaatu. A television commercial, which featured a voiceover from Lennon, depicted the cover's flying saucer (with Starr) over Los Angeles—landing on the roof of the Capitol Records Building in Hollywood. The commercial was produced by Vidtronics Company Inc. Starr returned the favour and did the voiceover for the commercial for Lennon's Walls and Bridges album. Immediately after filming the commercial, on 14 November 1974, the promo film for "Only You (And You Alone)" was filmed. During the video Starr and Nilsson mimed to the song, on top of the Capitol Records Building. The video aired on BBC TV's Top of the Pops show, on 19 December.

Goodnight Vienna was reissued in the US, this time by Capitol in February 1981. The album was remastered and reissued on CD on 30 November 1992 in the UK, and on 23 March 1993 in the US, with three bonus tracks: 1972 hit single "Back Off Boogaloo", its B-Side "Blindman" and an extended version of the McCartney-penned "Six O'Clock", a shorter version of which had earlier appeared on the LP version of Ringo.

Track listing
Side one
"(It's All Down to) Goodnight Vienna" (John Lennon) – 2:35
"Occapella" (Allen Toussaint) – 2:55
"Oo-Wee" (Vini Poncia, Richard Starkey) – 3:45
"Husbands and Wives" (Roger Miller) – 3:34
"Snookeroo" (Elton John, Bernie Taupin) – 3:27

Side two
 "All by Myself" (Poncia, Starkey) – 3:21
"Call Me" (Starkey) – 4:07
"No No Song" (Hoyt Axton, David Jackson) – 2:33
"Only You (And You Alone)" (Buck Ram) – 3:26
"Easy for Me" (Harry Nilsson) – 2:20
"Goodnight Vienna (Reprise)" (Lennon) – 1:20

1992 bonus tracks
 "Back Off Boogaloo" (Starkey) – 3:22
"Blindman" (Starkey) – 2:46
"Six O'Clock (Extended Version)" (Paul McCartney, Linda McCartney) – 5:23

Personnel

 Ringo Starr – lead vocals, drums, percussion
 Jim Keltner – drums
 John Lennon – piano, acoustic guitar, backing vocals
 Carl Fortina  – accordion
 Richard Bennett – electric guitar solo
 Dennis Coffey – guitars
 Steve Cropper – electric guitar
 Jesse Ed Davis – electric guitar
 Vini Poncia – acoustic guitar, backing vocals
 Robbie Robertson – guitars
 Alvin Robinson – guitar 
 Lon Van Eaton – guitars
 Klaus Voormann – bass guitar
 Richard Perry – bass guitar, backing vocals
 Dr. John – piano, backing vocals
 Elton John – piano
 David Foster – piano
 Tom Hensley – electric piano
 Nicky Hopkins – electric piano 
 Lincoln Mayorga – piano
 Billy Preston – electric piano, clavinet
 James Newton Howard – synthesizer
 Gary Wright – keyboards
 Chuck Findley – horns
 Bobby Keys – horns
 Trevor Lawrence – horns
 Lew McCreary – horns
 Steve Madaio – trumpet 
 Madeline Bell – backing vocals
 Lesley Duncan – backing vocals
 Jean Gilbert – backing vocals
 Jimmy Gilstrap – backing vocals
 Joe Greene – backing vocals
 Ira Hawkins – backing vocals
 Clydie King – backing vocals
 Linda Lawrence – backing vocals
 Harry Nilsson – backing vocals
 May Pang – backing vocals
 Masst Alberts – backing vocals
 Derrek Van Eaton – backing vocals
 Cynthia Webb – backing vocals

Charts

Weekly charts

Year-end charts

Certifications

Notes

References

External links

JPGR's Goodnight Vienna site

1974 albums
Ringo Starr albums
Apple Records albums
Albums produced by Richard Perry
Albums recorded at Sunset Sound Recorders